Quasqueton is a city in Buchanan County, Iowa, United States. The population was 570 at the time of the 2020 census. Just northwest of the town is Cedar Rock, a home designed by Frank Lloyd Wright, which is maintained by the state as a museum.

History
Quasqueton was the location that several Native American trails intersected. It was first settled by Euro-Americans in 1842 and had a post office starting in 1845. In 1858 the Quaqueton Mutual Protection Company was organized to prevent against horse thievery. In 1904 most of Quasqueton was destroyed in a fire.

Geography
Quasqueton is located at  (42.394662, -91.759173).

Demographics

2010 census
As of the census of 2010, there were 554 people, 232 households, and 162 families living in the city. The racial makeup of the city was 97.1% White, 0.9% African American, 0.2% Asian, 0.2% from other races, and 1.6% from two or more races. Hispanic or Latino of any race were 0.7% of the population.

There were 232 households, of which 24.6% had children under the age of 18 living with them, 57.8% were married couples living together, 7.8% had a female householder with no husband present, 4.3% had a male householder with no wife present, and 30.2% were non-families. 22.8% of all households were made up of individuals, and 9.5% had someone living alone who was 65 years of age or older. The average household size was 2.39 and the average family size was 2.80.

The median age in the city was 40.4 years. 20.9% of residents were under the age of 18; 9.3% were between the ages of 18 and 24; 26% were from 25 to 44; 30.7% were from 45 to 64; and 13% were 65 years of age or older. The gender makeup of the city was 51.8% male and 48.2% female.

2000 census
As of the census of 2000, there were 574 people, 227 households, and 167 families living in the city. The racial makeup of the city was 97.04% White, 1.39% African American, 1.05% Native American, 0.17% Asian, 0.35% from other races. Hispanic or Latino of any race were 0.87% of the population.

There were 227 households, out of which 31.3% had children under the age of 18 living with them, 61.7% were married couples living together, 9.3% had a female householder with no husband present, and 26.4% were non-families. 19.4% of all households were made up of individuals, and 10.1% had someone living alone who was 65 years of age or older. The average household size was 2.53 and the average family size was 2.92.

In the city, the population was spread out, with 26.1% under the age of 18, 6.3% from 18 to 24, 25.6% from 25 to 44, 26.8% from 45 to 64, and 15.2% who were 65 years of age or older. The median age was 38 years. For every 100 females, there were 104.3 males. For every 100 females age 18 and over, there were 101.9 males.

The median income for a household in the city was $36,518, and the median income for a family was $45,417. Males had a median income of $28,125 versus $23,750 for females. The per capita income for the city was $15,913. About 7.9% of families and 9.9% of the population were below the poverty line, including 13.6% of those under age 18 and 6.3% of those age 65 or over.

Notable person

Larry Lujack (born Larry Lee Blankenburg in Quasqueton, June 6, 1940; died December 18, 2013 in Santa Fe, New Mexico) Radio DJ, member of the National Radio Hall of Fame and NAB Hall of Fame. Best known for his work on radio stations WCFL (AM), and WLS AM/FM in Chicago.

References

External links

 
City-Data Comprehensive statistical data and more about Quasqueton

Cities in Buchanan County, Iowa
Cities in Iowa
1842 establishments in Iowa Territory